Takion (Joshua Saunders) is a fictional character, a superhero in the . The character was created by Paul Kupperberg and Aaron Lopresti, first appearing in an eponymous series in 1996 that lasted for 7 issues.

Fictional character biography

Josh Saunders, a blind psychologist, who was chosen by Highfather to become a Source Elemental and given the ability to manipulate the Source, because Highfather felt he was "a man without destiny" and therefore would not be missed. Highfather names him Takion of the Source and tells him that he must clean a taint from the Source. In reality, Takion was created as an Avatar of Highfather, as a security measure in the event of Highfather's death. In that moment, Takion was able to see everything, all his failures and victories, time was without boundary. He was even able to foresee Highfather's death.

While trying to deal with the ebb and flow of energy through his body into and out of the Source, Josh attracts the attention of Captain Atom, the Flash, Green Lantern; after a brief fight, he easily defeats all three heroes and leaves the planet feeling that with his immense power levels, he was a threat to everyone on Earth.

Cosmic awareness
The problem was that unlike a New God, Takion has cosmic awareness but has to filter this awareness and all the information it brought using the primitive thought structures of a human brain. This dissonance was making him unstable. He spent his time in space learning how to separate the future and past from the present, and forcing his awareness to exist only in the present. He allowed his body to discorporate so that he could re-assemble himself, which is when he first discovered the ability to possess others, read their minds and also their potential timeline and destiny. Takion also learned how to accept and use his cosmic awareness.

Stayne
Takion's main nemesis is Stayne, his dark counterpart who was a nameless human woman transformed by Darkseid's power. She is sent to keep Takion from achieving his true potential and to prevent him from learning about Darkseid's plan to destroy the Source Wall. After Stayne's creation, he is finally caught up to Darkseid and confronts her for the first time. Takion must deal with Stayne's ability to cut him off from the Source and the threatening fact that if she makes physical contact with the Wall first, she will gain control over reality.

Izaya's death
During the Genesis event, Highfather (Izaya) learned of Darkseid's plans to destroy the Source Wall and take control the Source itself. Izaya gathered a group of younger gods, including Zeus, Jove, Odin and Ares together to fight him. However, Ares rebelled against Highfather and killed him. Ares was imprisoned in the new Source Wall by the other gods.

Highfather
After Izaya's death, the role of Highfather is offered to Scott Free (Mister Miracle) who is Izaya's only living heir. Scott turns the offer down, leaving Takion to become the new Highfather. During a crisis, he asks for guidance from Highfather, who had become one with the Source. Highfather is able to temporarily return from the Source by using the body of his Avatar Takion, as this was the real purpose for Takion's creation. Highfather resurrects Supertown, providing the people of New Genesis with new hope.

Death
Takion travels to the Source Wall, accompanied by Himon in order to learn the identity of the serial killer that has slain many New Gods. Takion himself falls victim to and dies at the hands of the Infinity-Man.

Powers and abilities
 A living embodiment of the Source, and to the spirit of Highfather. He serves as a conduit and avatar, between the Source and the New Gods of New Genesis. He is one of the most powerful New Gods.
 Takion's only limit is the amount of energy existing in the Source, he cannot create new energy, but can channel and manipulate existing forms of energy. Takion is near omnipotent. He apparently can actively shift the signature of wave energy along its spectrum.
 He seems to be able to rewrite the atomic structure of matter by re-arranging the subatomic particles that form its identity matrix.
 He could become intangible at will as well as teleport.
 He could manipulate subjective time on a quantum level. 
 He could also dampen energy fields, including the ring of Green Lantern Kyle Rayner.

References

Sources
 GCD Project: Takion #1
 DCU Guide: Takion Profile
 DCU Guide: Takion Chronology
 New Gods Library: Takion
 New Gods Index: Highfather

External links
 DCU Guide: Takion #1
 Fanzing #44: Saunders Family Tree
 New Gods Comics Index

Characters created by Paul Kupperberg
DC Comics aliens
DC Comics characters with superhuman strength
DC Comics deities
DC Comics titles
New Gods of New Genesis
Fictional avatars
Comics characters introduced in 1996